Kačamak is a kind of maize porridge made in parts of Western Asia and Southeastern Europe. Its name is derived from the Turkish word kaçamak, meaning escapade. It is also known as bakrdan (бакрдан) in North Macedonia.

History
The dish is made of cornmeal. Potatoes, milk, white cheese or kaymak are sometimes added. Similar to the Abkhazian abısta, Adyghe mamıs, Italian polenta and Romanian mămăligă, it is prepared by boiling cornmeal and then mashing it while the pot is still on the stove. It was once regarded as a poor man's food, but now is widely eaten, including in restaurants.

Serving

In Bulgaria, it is traditionally served with heated lard or sunflower oil with small amounts of browned paprika or hot pepper. Often cracklings or sirene are added. 

In Montenegro, Albania and Herzegovina kačamak is also prepared with crushed potatoes and cheese until a thick mass is formed.

In Central Serbia, it is prepared with finer grains of white cornmeal, served with white cheese and kajmak. It is usually served with minced meat roasted in butter, boiled grape juice, milk, plain yogurt, honey, sour cream, or sometimes with bacon.

Gallery

References

Maize dishes
Porridges
Bosnia and Herzegovina cuisine
Bulgarian cuisine
Circassian cuisine
Montenegrin cuisine
Serbian cuisine
Turkish cuisine
National dishes